FV 08 Rottweil e.V. is a German sports club based in Rottweil, Baden-Württemberg. The team currently plays in the Landesliga Württemberg, the seventh tier of the German football league system. The team is currently managed by Uli Fischer.

History
The club was founded as 08 Rottweil on 3 June 1908 during a meeting at the Brauereigasthaus zum Pflug. In 1919 08 Rottweil and Germania Rottweil merged under the current name of FV 08 Rottweil. In June 2021 the club signed Ralf Volkwein as Sports Director, beating out many other clubs in the process. Volkwein was best known for his time as manager of TSG Balingen in which he was in charge of over 250 matches. However, he also played for Rottweil from 2000 and 2004, accumulating over 150 caps and 30 goals, and coached the club from 2008 to 2012.

Stadium
The club plays its home matches at the Stadion Rottweil. The stadium was completed in September 1950 as part of the city's 800th anniversary. The grandstand was added five years later. Renovation of the facility began in 2018 with the work expected to be completed by 2021.

Recent seasons

Key

Source:

References

External links
Official Website

Football clubs in Germany
Football clubs in Baden-Württemberg
1908 establishments in Germany
Association football clubs established in 1908
Multi-sport clubs in Germany